WWJL-LP was a low-power FM radio station licensed to Brookville, Pennsylvania, the county seat of Jefferson County.  Formerly operating at 95.9, this station has been silent since May 2007.

History

Beginnings as WMKX
The roots of WWJL can be traced back as early as April 1981, when Brookville's first radio station, WMKX, went on the air for the very first time at 95.9 FM.  WMKX continued to operate on this frequency until the mid-1990s, when the owners of Punxsutawney-based competitor WPXZ decided to put a new FM station on the air in Brookville.  To allow the 25,000 watt station to operate, channel shuffling among other FM stations in the area had to take place.  This affected the operation of WMKX, which took the opportunity to acquire WPXZ's frequency of 105.5 and increase its power from 3,000 to 25,000 watts and cover a much larger area.

Rebirth as WWJL

95.9 officially became available on March 3, 1997, when WMKX launched its new format and moniker "Megarock" at 105.5 in Brookville and its new simulcast station at 100.5 in Johnsonburg. With 95.9 now available, a local church, First Baptist Church, decided to capitalize on the vacant channel while it was still fresh in listeners' minds and expand its ministry through radio.  That opportunity presented itself with the debut of WWJL on a special LPFM license, issued in 2004.  The new station, under the direction of Reverend Rohn Peterson, programmed a mix of Contemporary Christian Music, plus full-service news and talk programming targeted to Brookville listeners.

The station did not prosper, as tithes and fundraisers were inadequate to keep the station going.  In 2007, First Baptist Church closed the station with a dark license, leaving the channel open for a new station, WZDB (now WQQP), to be constructed in the community of Sykesville, Pennsylvania by the end of the decade.

Station founder Rohn Peterson died in 2010, after a battle with cancer.

External links
 

WJL-LP
Defunct radio stations in the United States
WJL-LP
Radio stations established in 2000
Defunct religious radio stations in the United States
2000 establishments in Pennsylvania
Radio stations disestablished in 2007
2007 disestablishments in Pennsylvania
WJL-LP